The 1965 Georgia Bulldogs football team represented the Georgia Bulldogs of the University of Georgia during the 1965 NCAA University Division football season.

Schedule

Source: 1966 Georgia Bulldogs Football Media Guide/Yearbook

Roster

Game summaries

Michigan

Clemson

References

Georgia
Georgia Bulldogs football seasons
Georgia Bulldogs football